B.M.C. Durfee High School is a public high school located in the city of Fall River, Massachusetts, United States. It is a part of Fall River Public Schools and is the city's main public high school, the other being Diman Regional Vocational Technical High School.

History 
In 2014 the school and Bristol Community College (BCC) were planning an agreement regarding early college classes.

Buildings

The school has been located in two buildings.  From its opening in 1886 until the new building was completed in 1978 the school was located in the historic B.M.C. Durfee High School building on Rock Street, The iconic building, with its tall red-capped clock tower and red-domed observatory tower, overlooks the Taunton River and gives rise to the Fall River school district's seal, the school's athletics nickname, the Hilltoppers, their school colors of black and red (for the two roof colors), the school newspaper, the Hilltop, and their school alumni newspaper, the Chimes.  For several decades prior to moving, the school also occupied the former Technical High School building across the street.

Since 1978 the school has been located on Elsbree Street in the city's north end.  Located in former swamp land, the school was built both to modernize the district and to alleviate the overcrowding at the former sites.  The school also moved its athletic fields, which were nearby to the new school, to its new campus, as well as building the on-campus Luke Urban Field House, as the school had formerly used the Fall River Armory for indoor athletics.  Since 2011, there has also been a modern recreation of the Durfee clock tower located at the new site.

Athletics
Durfee's athletic teams are known as the Hilltoppers, a nod to the location of the old school building atop the Highland neighborhood hills overlooking the Taunton River, and their school colors are black and red.  As of the 2018–2019 school year, their school mascot is Rocky the Hilltopper.  The school fight song is sung to the tune of the Notre Dame Victory March.

Fall
Boys' and Girls' Cross Country
Boys' and Girls' Soccer
Cheerleading
Girls' Swimming
Girls' Volleyball
Football
Field Hockey
Golf
Winter
Boys' and Girls' Basketball
Boys' and Girls' Winter Track
Boys' Swimming
Cheerleading
Ice hockey
Wrestling
Spring
Boys' and Girls' Outdoor Track
Boys' and Girls' Tennis
Boys' Volleyball
Baseball
Softball

Notable alumni
Many of the below are considered distinguished alumni of Durfee by the B.M.C. Durfee Alumni Association.

Mark Bomback, former MLB player (Milwaukee Brewers, New York Mets, Toronto Blue Jays)
James Chace – (1949), historian
Warren A. Cole – (1908), founder of Lambda Chi Alpha International Fraternity
Morton Dean – (1953), American television news journalist
Margery Eagan, journalist and writer
Edward Francis Harrington – (1951), United States federal judge
Tom Gastall – (1951), former MLB player (Baltimore Orioles)
Russ Gibson, former MLB player (Boston Red Sox, San Francisco Giants)
Brandon Gomes, former MLB player (Tampa Bay Rays)
Chris Herren – (1994), former NBA player for the Denver Nuggets, Boston Celtics
Sam Hyde, comedian, co-creator of sketch comedy group Million Dollar Extreme, and actor and writer of Adult Swim's Million Dollar Extreme Presents: World Peace
Brig. Gen. John J. Liset, USAF – (1938), chief of the USAF Section of the Joint Brazil-United States Military Commission, and chief of the Air Force Section, Military Assistance Advisory Group in Brazil
James M. McGuire – (1931), Supreme Court Justice of the State of New York
Ernest Moniz – (1962), United States Secretary of Energy under Barack Obama
Humberto Sousa Medeiros – (1937), cardinal of the Roman Catholic Church; former archbishop of Boston
John Moriarty – (1948), vocal coach and accompanist and a conductor and stage director of productions at opera companies throughout America
Beatrice Hancock Mullaney – (1923), first female judge of the Massachusetts Probate Court
Jerome Namias – (1928), prominent American meteorologist; former Chief of the Extended Forecast Division of the National Weather Service and was involved in the research of both the Dust Bowl and El Niño phenomena
William J. Porter – (1930), American diplomat; former ambassador to Canada, Saudi Arabia, and others
Joseph Raposo – (1958), musician and lyricist for Sesame Street
William K. Reilly – (1958), former administrator of the United States Environmental Protection Agency and current director of DuPont
Andrew Sousa, former MLS Player (New England Revolution)
James M. Swift – (18??), first head football coach at Michigan State Normal School (now Eastern Michigan University)
Luke Urban, former MLB player (Boston Braves)
Gen. Melvin Zais, US Army – (1933), decorated United States Army general

See also

List of high schools in Massachusetts
B.M.C. Durfee High School (1886 building)

Sources

External links
 Durfee High Website
 Fall River Schools
 Durfee Alumni

Schools in Bristol County, Massachusetts
Public high schools in Massachusetts
1887 establishments in Massachusetts
Educational institutions established in 1887